Lake Wells Station, often referred to as Lake Wells, is a pastoral lease that operates as a cattle station.

Les Smith owned the property in 2013 and had been experiencing problems with stock theft for the previous nine years with thieves taking over 500,000 worth of stock during this time.

See also
List of ranches and stations

References

Goldfields-Esperance
Pastoral leases in Western Australia
Stations (Australian agriculture)